The Definitive Collection is a compilation album by singer  Michael Jackson released by Universal Motown in 2009, and the third album to be released since his death.

Charts 
The Definitive Collection charted on number 39 on Billboard 200 and number 17 on R&B/Hip Hop Albums.

Review 

Stephen Thomas Erlewine of Allmusic said: "Released roughly three days after Michael Jackson's passing, The Definitive Collection is a 19-track collection of highlights from his Motown recordings, including the hits he had with his brothers in the Jackson 5. This emphasizes Michael's solo hits over the Jackson 5's — there are ten cuts of him alone, nine with his brothers (and one of those is an alternate "minus mix" of "I'll Be There") — which skews this a little bit toward puppy love over bubblegum, something that may be a little too syrupy for some listeners, but there's no denying that for fans lacking a collection of Michael's earliest hits, this is a useful compilation, gathering "I Want You Back", "ABC", "The Love You Save", "Who's Lovin' You", "Never Can Say Goodbye", "Got to Be There", "Rockin' Robin", "Ben", and "Dancing Machine" in one place."

Track listing

References 

2009 compilation albums
Michael Jackson compilation albums
Motown compilation albums
Compilation albums published posthumously